Microcoelus (meaning "small hollow") is a dubious genus of small titanosaurian sauropod dinosaur native to Argentina. It is known from only a single dorsal vertebra. A left humerus was formerly referred to this species, but it is now considered to belong to Neuquensaurus. This species may be a synonym of the contemporary sauropod Neuquensaurus australis.

It was described by British paleontologist Richard Lydekker in 1893.

References

Titanosaurs
Late Cretaceous dinosaurs of South America
Fossil taxa described in 1893
Taxa named by Richard Lydekker